Lorenzo José González Montesdeoca (born 10 April 2000) is a Swiss professional footballer who plays as a forward for Spanish club AD Ceuta FC.

Club career

Manchester City
Born in Las Palmas, Canary Islands to a Spanish mother and a Swiss father, González moved to Geneva at early age and joined Servette FC's youth setup at the age of five. In July 2016, after reportedly attracting interest from Real Madrid and Manchester City, he signed a four-year contract with the latter.

After progressing through City's Academy, González made his senior debut with the under-21 squad on 25 September 2018, starting and scoring the second of a 4–1 EFL Trophy away defeat of Crewe Alexandra.

Málaga
On 2 September 2019, González signed for Málaga CF in Segunda División. He made his professional debut on 17 September, coming on as a second-half substitute for David Lombán in a 1–1 home draw against Rayo Vallecano. He totalled six appearances, starting one in a goalless draw with Sporting de Gijón at La Rosaleda Stadium on 29 September.

St. Gallen
On 24 January 2020, González signed for FC St. Gallen in Swiss Super League, accepting the league's minimum salary of €40,000 per half season. He played only once, as a 68th-minute substitute for Angelo Campos in a 2–1 win at former team Servette on 21 May 2021, the last day of his second season.

On 10 September 2021, González joined FK Ústí nad Labem on loan. He played 14 games in the Czech National Football League, scoring once in his second game on 17 September to open a 2–0 home win over FK Varnsdorf. He was released by St. Gallen on 23 June 2022.

Ceuta
In July 2022, González returned to Spain by signing for AD Ceuta FC in the third-tier Primera Federación.

Career statistics

References

External links

2000 births
Footballers from Las Palmas
Swiss people of Spanish descent
Spanish people of Swiss descent
Living people
Swiss men's footballers
Switzerland youth international footballers
Spanish footballers
Association football forwards
Manchester City F.C. players
Málaga CF players
FC St. Gallen players
FK Ústí nad Labem players
AD Ceuta FC players
Segunda División players
Primera Federación players
Czech National Football League players
Swiss expatriate footballers
Spanish expatriate footballers
Expatriate footballers in England
Swiss expatriate sportspeople in England
Spanish expatriate sportspeople in England
Expatriate footballers in the Czech Republic
Swiss expatriate sportspeople in the Czech Republic
Spanish expatriate sportspeople in the Czech Republic